Shurabeh Khuran (also Romanized as Shūrābeh Khūrān; also known as Shūrābeh Taran) is a village in Zarneh Rural District, Zarneh District, Eyvan County, Ilam Province, Iran. At the 2006 census, its population was 265, in 52 families. The village is populated by Kurds.

References 

Populated places in Eyvan County
Kurdish settlements in Ilam Province